This is a list of launches made by the Proton rocket between 2000 and 2009. All launches were conducted from the Baikonur Cosmodrome.

Launches

| colspan="6" |

2000

|-

| colspan="6" |

2001

|-

| colspan="6" |

2002

|-

| colspan="6" |

2003

|-

| colspan="6" |

2004

|-

| colspan="6" |

2005

|-

| colspan="6" |

2006

|-

| colspan="6" |

2007

|-

| colspan="6" |

2008

|-

| colspan="6" |

2009

|-

|}

References 

 
 
 
 

Universal Rocket (rocket family)
Proton2000
Proton launches